Italy is one of the leading countries in fashion design, alongside France, the United States and the United Kingdom. Fashion has always been an important part of the country's cultural life and society, and Italians are well known for their attention to dress; la bella figura, or good appearance, retains its traditional importance.

Italian fashion became prominent during the 11th to 16th centuries, when artistic development in Italy was at its peak. Cities such as Rome, Palermo, Venice, Milan, Naples, Florence and Vicenza started to produce luxury goods, hats, cosmetics, jewelry and rich fabrics. From the 17th century to the early 20th, Italian fashion lost its importance and lustre and Europe's main trendsetter became France, with the great popularity of French fashion; this is due to the luxury dresses which were designed for the courtiers of Louis XIV. However, since the 1951–53 fashion soirées held by Giovanni Battista Giorgini in Florence, the "Italian school" started to compete with the French haute couture, and  labels such as Ferragamo and Gucci began to contend with Chanel and Dior. In 2009, according to the Global Language Monitor, Milan, Italy's centre of design, was ranked the top fashion capital of the world, and Rome was ranked fourth, and, although both cities fell in subsequent rankings, in 2011, Florence entered as the 31st world fashion capital. Milan is generally considered to be one of the "big four" global fashion capitals, along with New York, Paris, and London; occasionally, the "big five" also includes Rome.

Italian fashion is linked to the most generalized concept of "Made in Italy", a merchandise brand expressing excellence of creativity and craftsmanship. Italian luxury goods are renowned for the quality of the textiles and the elegance and refinement of their construction. Many French, British and American high-top luxury brands (such as Chanel, Dior, Balmain and the main line of Ralph Lauren) also rely on Italian craft factories, located in highly specialized areas in the metropolitan area of Naples and in the centre-north of Italy (Tuscany, Marche, Veneto and Piedmont), to produce parts of their apparel and accessories.

The nonprofit association that co-ordinates and promotes the development of Italian fashion is the National Chamber of Italian Fashion (Camera Nazionale della Moda Italiana), now led by Carlo Capasa. It was set up in 1958 in Rome and now is settled in Milan and represents all the highest cultural values of Italian fashion. This association has pursued a policy of organisational support aimed at the knowledge, promotion and development of fashion through high-profile events in Italy and abroad. The talent of young, creative fashion is also promoted in Italy, as in the annual ITS (International Talent Support Awards) young fashion designer competition in Trieste.

Italian fashion houses, designers and luxury brands 
Examples of major Italian fashion houses focused on both menswear and womenswear, but also accessories:

 Armani (founded and directed by Giorgio Armani)
 Renato Balestra
 Bottega Veneta (designed by French Matthieu Blazy)
 Roberto Cavalli (created by Fausto Puglisi)
 Costume National
 Brunello Cucinelli
 Diesel (directed by Glenn Martens)
 Dolce & Gabbana
 Dsquared2 (created by Canadian duo Dean and Dan Caten)
 Etro (directed by Marco De Vincenzo)
 Fendi (previously directed by Karl Lagerfeld for women's clothes and ready to wear and now by Kim Jones and by Silvia Venturini Fendi for accessories and men's lines)
 Salvatore Ferragamo (designed by Maximilian Davis)
 Gianfranco Ferré
 Fiorucci
 Gucci (formerly directed by Tom Ford and later on by Alessandro Michele)
 Iceberg (directed by James Long)
 Kiton
 Loro Piana
 Marni (founded by Consuelo Castiglioni and now directed by Francesco Risso)
 Missoni
 Moncler
 Moschino (directed by Jeremy Scott)
 Prada (Raf Simons joined Miuccia Prada as co-creative director)
 Richmond
 Jil Sander
 Ermanno Scervino
 Tod's (designed by Walter Chiapponi)
 Trussardi (under the directorship of Benjamin Alexander Huseby and Serhat Isik)
 Valentino (founded by Valentino Garavani and now directed by PierPaolo Piccioli)
 Versace (founded by Gianni Versace and now directed by Donatella Versace)
 
Examples of major fashion brands which are specialized mainly at womenswear (and also accessories for women) are Agnona, Laura Biagiotti, Blumarine (created by Anna Molinari), Capucci (directed by Mario Dice), Alberta Ferretti, Gattinoni, Genny (designed by Sara Cavazza Facchini), Giamba (created by designer Giambattista Valli), Krizia (founded by Mariuccia Mandelli and now art directored by Zhu Chongyun), La Perla, Luisa Spagnoli, Max Mara (created by Ian Griffiths), Miu Miu (founded and directed by Miuccia Prada), Philosophy (directed by Lorenzo Serafini), Emilio Pucci (created by Camille Miceli), Mila Schon and Twin-set Milano whilst the most important luxury houses which focus only on menswear and accessories for men are Brioni, Canali, Corneliani, Lardini, Stefano Ricci, Ermenegildo Zegna (directed by Alessandro Sartori) and Pal Zileri.

Luxury sportswear and streetwear have become general fashion trends, mixing high and low, formal and active style in one look and also in this segment Italy, apart from big luxury brands focused on ready to wear (or couture) developing their own streetstyle lines or items such as Gucci, Fendi, Moschino and Prada or top brands with a strong sporty heritage like Bikkembergs, has got a few high end companies focused on this style like GCDS, OFF White founded by American Virgil Abloh but based in Milan, Stone island. In sportswear some of the most prominent houses are Diadora, Fila, and Kappa.

A few Italian designers head (or have headed) some important fashion brands outside Italy. Riccardo Tisci had been working for French luxury house Givenchy for twelve years until 2017 and in 2018 was named British Burberry's creative director until 2022, Maria Grazia Chiuri after co-heading at Valentino together with Pier Paolo Piccioli now is the first female creative director ever at Dior, French fashion brand Rochas had been directed by Alessandro Dell'Acqua for a few years, Marco Colagrossi heads Ungaro after a few years under the directorship of Fausto Puglisi, Nino Cerruti founded his own Paris-based fashion house, Giambattista Valli's main ready to wear and high fashion lines are set in Paris and Stefano Pilati was for almost eight years Saint Laurent's head designer.

Among the newest labels or younger designers, the most prominent are Golden Goose Deluxe Brand and Stella Jean. 

Other luxury labels which are mainly focused on the production of leather goods such as accessories, especially shoes (but not only), are Baldinini, Ballin, Bontoni, Rene Caovilla, Bruno Magli, Cesare Paciotti, Pollini, Sergio Rossi, Giuseppe Zanotti, while fashion brands or labels which produce primarily bags, totes, suitcases are Braccialini, Furla, Mandarina Duck, Piquadro, Valextra.
 
Italy also is home to many fashion magazines, such as Vogue Italia, Vanity Fair, Elle, Glamour, Grazia.

Other Italian accessory and jewelry brands, such as Luxottica (owner, amongst several luxury eyewear brands, of Ray-Ban and Persol), Safilo, Buccellati, Damiani, Vhernier, Pomellato, Morellato, Officine Panerai and Bvlgari.

Modern history

Fashion in Italy started to become the most fashionable in Europe since the 11th century, and powerful cities of the time, such as Venice, Milan, Florence, Naples, Vicenza and Rome began to produce robes, jewelry, textiles, shoes, fabrics, ornaments and elaborate dresses.  Italian fashion reached its peak during the Renaissance.  As Italy is widely recognized as the cradle and birthplace of the Renaissance, art, music, education, finance and philosophy flourished, and along with it, Italian fashion designs became very  popular (especially those worn by the Medicis in Florence.  The fashions of Queen Catherine de' Medici of France were considered amongst the most fashionable in Europe.

After a decline in the 17th to mid-20th century, Italy returned to being a leading nation in fashion, and Florence was Italy's fashion capital in the 50s and 60s from the very first high fashion parade at the Sala Bianca of the Pitti Palace in 1952 with names such as Emilio Schuberth, Emilio Pucci, Vincenzo Ferdinandi, Roberto Capucci, Sorelle Fontana, Germana Marucelli, Mila Schön, Fausto Sarli, whilst Milan led the way in the 70s and 80s, with then-new labels, such as Armani, Enrico Coveri, Dolce & Gabbana, Gianfranco Ferré, Romeo Gigli, Krizia, Missoni, Moschino, Luciano Soprani, Trussardi and Versace and  opening up and setting up their first boutiques and emporia.  Until the 1970s, Italian fashion was mainly designed for the rich and famous, more or less like the French "Haute Couture".  Yet, in the 1970s and 80s, Italian fashion started to concentrate on ready-to-wear clothes, such as coats, jackets, trousers, shirts, jeans, jumpers and miniskirts. Milan became more affordable and stylish for shoppers, and Florence was deposed of its position as the Italian fashion capital and replaced by Rome, which grew in importance as high fashion pole in the country thanks to the creations of Valentino, Fendi, Roberto Capucci, Renato Balestra and Gattinoni.

Today, Milan and Rome are Italy's fashion capitals, and are major international centres for fashion design, competing with other cities such as Tokyo, Los Angeles, London, Paris and New York. Also, other cities such as Venice, Florence, Naples, Vicenza, Bologna, Genoa and Turin are important centres.  The country's main shopping districts are the Via Montenapoleone fashion district and the Galleria Vittorio Emanuele (Milan), Via dei Condotti (Rome), and Via de' Tornabuoni (Florence).

Cities 
Italian fashion is dominated by Milan, Rome, and to a lesser extent, Florence, with the former two being included in the top 30 fashion capitals of the world. Nonetheless, there are numerous other cities which play an important role in Italian fashion.

Milan

In 2014, Milan was regarded as the world fashion capital (based upon frequency of mention in global media outlets), even surpassing New York, Paris, Rome and London. In 2011, Milan was ranked #4, behind London, New York, and Paris.  Many of the major Italian fashion brands, such as Valentino, Versace, Prada, Armani, Dolce & Gabbana, Marni, Iceberg, Missoni, Trussardi, Moschino, Dirk Bikkembergs, Etro, and Zegna are currently headquartered in the city. International fashion labels also operate shops in Milan, including an Abercrombie & Fitch flagship store which has become a main consumer attraction. Milan also hosts a fashion week twice a year, just like other international centres such as Paris, London and New York. Milan's main upscale fashion district is the "quadrilatero della moda" (literally, "fashion quadrilateral"), where the city's most prestigious shopping streets (Via Montenapoleone, Via della Spiga, Via Sant'Andrea, Via Manzoni and Corso Venezia) are held.  The Galleria Vittorio Emanuele II, the Piazza del Duomo, Via Dante and Corso Buenos Aires are other important shopping streets and squares.

Florence

Florence is regarded by some as the birthplace and earliest centre of the modern (post World War Two) fashion industry in Italy.  The Florentine "soirées" of the early 1950s organized by Giovanni Battista Giorgini were events where several now-famous Italian designers participated in group shows and first garnered international attention. Florence has served as the home of the Italian fashion company Salvatore Ferragamo since 1928. Gianfranco Lotti, Gucci, Roberto Cavalli, Ermanno Scervino, Stefano Ricci, Patrizia Pepe, Enrico Coveri and Emilio Pucci were also founded and most of them are still headquartered in Florence.  Other major players in the fashion industry such as Prada and Chanel have large offices and stores in Florence or its outskirts. Florence's main upscale shopping street is Via de' Tornabuoni, where major luxury fashion houses and jewelry labels, such as Armani and Bulgari, have their elegant boutiques.  Via del Parione and Via Roma are other streets that are also well known for their high-end fashion stores.

Rome

Rome is widely recognized as a world fashion capital. Although not as important as Milan, Rome is the world's 4th most important centre for fashion in the world, according to the 2009 Global Language Monitor after Milan, New York and Paris, and beating London.  Major Italian luxury fashion houses and jewelry chains, such as Valentino, Bulgari, Fendi, Laura Biagiotti, Gattinoni and Brioni, just to name a few, are headquartered or were founded in the city.  Also, other major labels, such as Chanel, Prada, Dolce & Gabbana, Armani and Versace have luxury boutiques in Rome, primarily along its prestigious and upscale Via dei Condotti. The Rome Fashion Week is an important global showcase.

Other cities
Although Milan, Rome and Florence are commonly regarded as the leading cities in Italian fashion, other cities, such as Venice, Vicenza, Prato, Turin, Naples and Bologna, are also important centres for Italian clothing design and industry. Venice, for instance, is the home of Italian fashion house Roberta di Camerino, which was founded in 1945. The brand is famous for its handbags, and is most notably associated with the creation of the it bag, a form of handbag which is recognisable due to its status symbol. Brands such as Max Mara and United Colors of Benetton, despite being major Italian brands, are not headquartered in Milan, Rome or Florence, yet, the former has its headquarters in Reggio Emilia, and the latter in Ponzano Veneto. Italian holding OTB held by Renzo Rosso, owner of different ready-to-wear brands such as Diesel and also fashion houses like Marni, Dutch label Viktor & Rolf and Belgian Maison Margiela, is headquartered in the countryside near Vicenza in the region of Veneto. Italian companies Cesare Paciotti and also Tod's, owned by businessman Diego Della Valle (which produces luxury shoes, other leather goods and also clothes under the labels of Tod's itself, Roger Vivier, Hogan, Fay and haute couture brand Schiaparelli), Santoni, Bontoni are headquartered in the region of Marche, a very important manufacturing district for shoes and leather components in the Adriatic coast. Fashion houses Fabiana Filippi and Brunello Cucinelli's home is the region of Umbria and luxury brands Kiton and Harmont & Blaine were founded in Naples which is also another prominent area of the country for the manufacturing of apparel and accessories (especially shoes and leather goods in general around the district of Solofra).

Fashion shows and fairs 

The Milan Fashion Week takes place twice a year after the London Fashion Week and before the Paris Fashion Week. It is scheduled as the third of the four most important and global international ready-to-wear fashion weeks of the calendar during the so-called fashion month. Dates are determined by the Camera Nazionale della Moda Italiana. Some of the locations where fashion shows are held are Milan's Palazzo Reale, Palazzo Serbelloni, Padiglione Visconti, Spazio delle Cavallerizze at Leonardo Da Vinci museum and many others.
Another prominent platform for men's collections and new projects in fashion industry is Pitti Immagine in Florence at the Fortezza da Basso, held twice a year a few days before the Milanese man's fashion week.

References

Further reading 
 
 Dagmar Reichardt, Moda Made in Italy. Il linguaggio della moda e del costume italiano, edited and with a preface by Dagmar Reichardt and Carmela D'Angelo (Ed.), presenting an interview with Dacia Maraini, Firenze, Franco Cesati Editore, (Civiltà italiana. Terza serie, no. 10), 2016,, 230 pp.

External links 

 Made-In-Italy.com Official Website
25 Best Italian Fashion Brands - Italy Best Official Website